(MLK), full name  (m-l), was a communist political organization in Sweden formed in 1970 by  (Left Youth League), the youth organization of VPK. Within VUF several ultraleftist tendencies had surged during the 1960s, orientating it toward Maoism. VUF broke with VPK in 1968, and in 1970 they formed MLK. MLK was ideologically almost identical with the larger KFML/SKP, with Marxism–Leninism-Mao Zedong Thought as the ideological backbone. MLK supported KFML/SKP in elections.

MLK suffered a major split in 1972 when a group under leadership of Anders Carlberg (had been the chairman of VUF) left MLK and formed  (League COMMUNIST).

The two latter ones were published between 1971 and 1978.

MLK maintain four bookstores, named after Set Persson, in Stockholm, Trollhättan, Sundsvall and Kiruna.

In 1981 MLK unified itself with Röd Ungdom, the youth organization of SKP.

1970 establishments in Sweden
1981 disestablishments in Sweden
Communist organizations in Sweden
Defunct organizations based in Sweden
Maoist organizations in Europe
Organizations disestablished in 1981
Organizations established in 1970